The Preis der Sparkassen-Finanzgruppe is a Group 3 flat horse race in Germany open to thoroughbreds aged four years or older. It is run at Baden-Baden over a distance of 2,000 metres (about 1¼ miles), and it is scheduled to take place each year in late August.

History
The event was established in 1956, and it was originally called the Spreti-Rennen. It was initially contested over 2,400 metres.

The present system of race grading was introduced in Germany in 1972, and the Spreti-Rennen was classed at Group 3 level. It was cut to 2,200 metres in 1987, and to 2,000 metres in 1990.

The race became known as the Preis der Badischen Sparkassen in 1998, and it was renamed the Preis der Sparkassen-Finanzgruppe in 2001.

Records
Most successful horse (2 wins):
 Turkrano – 1959, 1960
 Anatas – 1985, 1986
 Karinga Bay – 1992, 1993
 Elle Danzig – 1999, 2000
 Diamante – 2001, 2003
 Wiesenpfad – 2007, 2009

Leading jockey (6 wins):
 Georg Bocskai – Prairie Snoopy (1978), Tombos (1984), Anatas (1985, 1986), El Salto (1987), Turfkönig (1991)

Leading trainer (7 wins):
 Heinz Jentzsch – Lombard (1972), Schiwago (1973), Ebano (1977), Tombos (1984), Anatas (1985, 1986), El Salto (1987)

Winners since 1971

Earlier winners
 1956: Nizam
 1957: Franc Tireur
 1958: Obermaat
 1959: Turkrano
 1960: Turkrano

 1961: Alpsee
 1962: Veni
 1963: Novum
 1964: Cher
 1965: Wiesenklee

 1966: Fontanus / Goldbube *
 1967: Birgitz
 1968: Norfolk
 1969: Fant
 1970: Tajo

* The 1966 race was a dead-heat and has joint winners.

See also
 List of German flat horse races

References
 Racing Post:

 galopp-sieger.de – Preis der Sparkassen-Finanzgruppe (ex Spreti-Rennen).
 horseracingintfed.com – International Federation of Horseracing Authorities – Race Detail (2011).
 pedigreequery.com – Spreti-Rennen – Baden-Baden.

Open middle distance horse races
Horse races in Germany
Recurring sporting events established in 1956